Cleavage stimulation factor 64 kDa subunit, tau variant is a protein that in humans is encoded by the CSTF2T gene.

References

External links

Further reading